The International Christian Fellowship (ICF) is an interdenominational church in Sapporo, Hokkaidō, Japan. ICF was founded in 1991 by the present pastor, Jerry Jantzen. It has a membership of around 200 people.

External links
ICF Sapporo

Churches in Japan
Christian organizations established in 1991
Religious buildings and structures in Hokkaido
20th-century Protestant churches

Sapporo
1991 establishments in Japan